The Mid-Atlantic Ridge Ecosystem Project MAR-ECO is an international research project in which scientists from 16 nations take part. Norway, represented by the Institute of Marine Research and the University of Bergen, co-ordinates the project which will enhance our understanding of occurrence, distribution and ecology of animals and animal communities along the Mid-Atlantic Ridge between Iceland and the Azores. The Mid-Atlantic Ridge is the volcanic mountain range in the middle of the ocean, marking the spreading zone between the Eurasian and American continental plates. New ocean floor is constantly being formed, and Iceland and the Azores are volcanic islands created when the mid-ocean ridge breaks the sea surface. The groups of animals to be studied are fishes, crustaceans, cephalopods (squids) and a wide range of gelatinous animals (e.g. jellyfish) living either near the seabed or in midwater above the ridge.

The research programme Census of Marine Life seriously addresses this situation and challenges marine biologists to utilize the most advanced technology to achieve true new information in areas of the ocean that were poorly studied previously. The project MAR-ECO, an element of the Census of Marine Life, rises to the challenge and investigates the diverse animal life along the vast underwater mountain chains of the open ocean.

History
MAR-ECO adopts the most advanced technology and instruments for observing and sample the animals and to tackle the challenge of working to 3500 m depth and in rugged terrain. An international multidisciplinary team of biologists, oceanographers, and engineers is offered this rare opportunity. A number of countries have committed their best research vessels, and in the 2003-2005 and 2007-2010 field phases a number of research cruise were conducted. In 2004, a two-month major international expedition was carried out by the new Norwegian vessel RV G.O. Sars, but vessels from Iceland, Russia, Germany, the United Kingdom, USA, and Portugal have also made major contributions. In June 2003 a Russian-US cruise using the manned submersibles MIR-1 and -2 took scientists to areas never before visited by humans at 4500m below the surface.
Contributing to sustainable development

MAR-ECO shall enhance the basic knowledge of ocean life and thereby contribute to a sustainable international management of marine resources and the priceless biodiversity of the marine environment. Knowledge obtained by a unified international effort carries greater weight in the policy-making processes than information gathered by isolated national research. Good science may hopefully lead to international consensus on appropriate action.

MAR-ECO and the Census of Marine Life emphasises public outreach and even in the planning phase MAR-ECO has enjoyed considerable public attention and support. Expeditions to unknown depths of the oceans appear to have great appeal, both to scientists and the interested laymen of all ages.

Management
The MAR-ECO management consists of a Norwegian secretariat, a public outreach group, and an international steering group. The co-ordinating institutions are Institute of Marine Research and the University of Bergen in Norway. 

Members of the international steering group are experienced scientists from key institutions in Norway, Iceland, Portugal (Azores), France, Germany, United Kingdom, USA, Russia and Brazil. Chair: Odd Aksel Bergstad, Norway.

The project consists of 10 integrated science components dealing with different key objectives, each with dedicated teams and principal investigators. In addition, a range of education and outreach components facilitates dissemination of results to a wide audience. 

Common critical tasks are funded by A.P.Sloan Foundation (USA), and national sources.

Public Outreach Group and associates
The Public Outreach Group is based in Bergen, Norway, but has associates among project participants in other countries. The group works closely with the Education and Outreach team of the Census of Marine Life based in the USA.

Backgrounders
The Mar-ECO project presented an exhibit in the Sant Ocean Hall of the Smithsonian Museum of Natural History in Washington, DC in 2010.  The exhibit featured specimens, photography, art, models, and multimedia about the discoveries of the program.

References

External links
 MAR-ECOWebsite
 international steering group
 Odd Aksel Bergstad, Norway.
 10 integrated science components
 Sponsors
 MAR-ECO Exhibit
 Institute of Marine Research
 University of Bergen, Bergen Museum, Norway
 Public Outreach Group
 Department of Biology ,University of Bergen, Norway.
 Department of Information Science and Media Studies, University of Bergen, Norway

Marine biology
Atlantic Ocean